Glyptolepis is an extinct genus of porolepiform lobe-finned fish which lived during Devonian Period, from the early Eifelian to Frasnian Age.

References

Porolepiformes
Prehistoric lobe-finned fish genera
Devonian bony fish
Fossil taxa described in 1841
Fossils of Russia